R v Mercure was a ruling by the Supreme Court of Canada in 1988, dealing with language rights in the province of Saskatchewan.

The appellant demanded the right to a statutory provision in Saskatchewan governing a speeding ticket be expressed in French as well as the right to have a trial conducted in French.  English and French are both considered official languages in Canada.

Lower courts had denied him this right, so he sought appeal to the Supreme Court of Canada.  However, the appellant died before the Supreme Court could hear his appeal.  The Court exercised its discretion to hear the appeal notwithstanding its mootness because the case not only raised an important legal issue but satisfied the other criteria for the hearing of a moot appeal, including the continued existence of a proper adversarial context.

The Supreme Court ruled that language rights enjoyed an almost constitutional status and could only be repealed by a 'clear legislative pronouncement'.  The Legislative Assembly of Saskatchewan subsequently repealed official bilingualism.

References

External links
 text of decision (in English).
 text of decision (in French)

Supreme Court of Canada cases
1988 in Canadian case law
Language case law
Bilingualism in Canada
Saskatchewan law